Vavatn is a lake in the municipality of Hemsedal in Viken county, Norway. It is a water source for Gjuva kraftverk, a hydro-electric power plant, which utilizes the waterfall from the lake into the Gjuva river as it enters the valley of  Grøndalen. The power station was put into operation in 1957 but was rehabilitated in 1995. The owner-operator is E- CO Energi.

References

External links
E-CO Energi website

See also
List of lakes in Norway

Lakes of Viken (county)